Newfoundland Quarterly is a literary magazine published by Memorial University of Newfoundland in St. John's, Newfoundland and Labrador, Canada. Having begun as "a literary magazine of interest to Newfoundlanders at home and abroad," Newfoundland Quarterly today calls itself "a cultural journal of Newfoundland and Labrador", and publishes articles on the province's culture and history, including biography, local history, book reviews, visual art and poetry. Founded in 1901, it is Canada's longest running magazine.

History 
Newfoundland Quarterly was founded in 1901 by John J. Evans, Senior, a printer and publisher in St. John's, Newfoundland and Labrador, who became its first editor. Patrick O'Flaherty, writing about the early years of the Quarterly in The Rock Observed: Studies in the Literature of Newfoundland, noted that "The dominant theme in the Quarterly was local history, but there were also excursions into biography, humour, poetry, and story-telling." In 1940 editorship was passed on to John Evans, Junior, who ran the magazine until it was briefly discontinued in December 1951. In 1953 Newfoundland Quarterly was purchased and resurrected by Lemuel Janes, also a printer by trade. He retired in 1965 and sold the magazine to Creative Printers and Publishers Ltd. In 1981, the magazine was sold to Memorial University of Newfoundland, its current publisher, for the sum of $1.

Joan Sullivan is the current managing editor of Newfoundland Quarterly.

Notable Contributors 
 Daniel Woodley Prowse
 Michael Francis Howley
 Henry LeMessurier
 Charles Cavendish Boyle
 Edward Morris, 1st Baron Morris
 Arthur Scammell
 Joey Smallwood
 Gregory J. Power
 Harold Horwood
 Tom Dawe
 Percy Janes
 Bernice Morgan
 Ted Russell
 Ray Guy
 Helen Parsons Shepherd
 Helen Fogwill Porter
 Mary Dalton
 Wallace Ryan

References

External links
 Newfoundland Quarterly
 Memorial University of Newfoundland Digital Archives Initiative – Newfoundland Quarterly (issues from 1901–1965 are available online) 

Literary magazines published in Canada
Local interest magazines published in Canada
Quarterly magazines published in Canada
Culture of St. John's, Newfoundland and Labrador
Magazines established in 1901
Magazines published in Newfoundland and Labrador
Mass media in St. John's, Newfoundland and Labrador
Memorial University of Newfoundland